The 2022 World MTB Orienteering Championships took place in Falun and Säter Municipality in Sweden from 15 to 20 July 2022.

Program
All times are Central European Summer Time (UTC+02:00).

Medal summary

Senior

U20

Medal table

References

External links
Home page

World Mountain Bike Orienteering Championships
Sports competitions in Falun
2022 in Swedish sport
MTB
World MTB Orienteering Championships